The Australian Conservative Party was founded as a registered political party in 1989, under the leadership of Sir Joh Bjelke-Petersen, the Premier of Queensland from 1968 to 1988.   It remained active until 1991 when it was deregistered by the Australian Electoral Commission (AEC) when the membership fell below the required 500 members. The party then attempted to reform under the "Australian Conservative Alliance", also known as Australia First, in 1995.

After two years since his ousting as Leader of the National Party, former Queensland Premier, Sir Joh, announced the launching of a new conservative political party, the Australian Conservative Party, in front of one-hundred people in Hervey Bay, Queensland. He created the party alongside Lin Powell.

See also
Joh for Canberra

References

Defunct political parties in Australia
1989 establishments in Australia
Political parties established in 1989
Political parties disestablished in 1991
1991 disestablishments in Australia
Conservative parties in Australia